Berry Hoogeveen (born 22 August 1978) is a Dutch former professional footballer who played as a midfielder.

Career
Hoogeveen played in the Eerste Divisie for FC Emmen, Heracles Almelo, SC Veendam and SC Cambuur between 1998 and 2007.

After the 2006–07 season, Hoogeveen moved to the lower tiers of Dutch football, playing on amateur contracts with WKE, HHC Hardenberg and DZOH, before retiring from football altogether in 2017.

References

1978 births
Living people
Footballers from Emmen, Netherlands
Dutch footballers
FC Emmen players
Heracles Almelo players
SC Veendam players
SC Cambuur players
Eerste Divisie players
Association football midfielders
Vierde Divisie players
Derde Divisie players
WKE players
HHC Hardenberg players